Corunna is the traditional English name of the city of A Coruña in Spain and the surrounding province of A Coruña.

Corunna may also refer to:

Battles
Battle of Corunna, fought near Corunna in 1809
First Battle of the Corunna Road, fought near Madrid in 1936
Second Battle of the Corunna Road, 1936–37
Third Battle of the Corunna Road, 1937

Places

Australia
Corunna, New South Wales, a small town and rural locality in Eurobodalla Shire, New South Wales
Corunna Station, a pastoral lease in South Australia

United States
Corunna, Indiana
Corunna, Michigan
Corunna High School

Other
Corunna, Ontario, Canada, named for the 1809 battle
Corunna Barracks, former barracks in Ludgershall, Wiltshire, England

Other uses
HMS Corunna (D97), United Kingdom warship

See also
A Coruña (disambiguation)